"Chuck Versus the Beefcake" is the fifteenth episode of the second season of Chuck. It originally aired on March 2, 2009. The team is ordered to retrieve Fulcrum intelligence hidden in the belt buckle that is in the possession of an agent named Cole Barker (Jonathan Cake), who they codenamed beefcake. Upon capture, Cole is revealed to be an undercover MI6 agent. Though broken up with Sarah Walker, Chuck Bartowski becomes jealous after noting Sarah's interest in Cole. Meanwhile, Jeff Barnes and Lester Patel's search for a new Buy More employee turns into a search for the "Buy More Babe". Morgan Grimes' reluctance to live with his mother while she is in a relationship with Big Mike leads to Chuck and Morgan to make an important decision.

Plot

Main plot
Cole Barker (Jonathan Cake) robs the grave of Brad White, a Fulcrum agent killed in "Chuck Versus the Suburbs" after testing an Intersect prototype on Chuck Bartowski. At Castle, General Beckman (Bonita Friedericy) orders Chuck, Sarah Walker, and John Casey to determine why someone would rob a CIA dump site and how that person even knew where to find it. Later, Beckman informs the team that the grave robber is Cole Barker, a Fulcrum agent. Chuck suddenly flashes to learn that Cole's belt buckle belonged to White and contains government intelligence. Casey reveals that Sarah will have to seduce Cole to remove his pants, ironically after Chuck has just "dumped" her (See "Chuck and Sarah").

Sarah seduces Cole at a hotel bar. As they ride an elevator to his room, Chuck flashes to identify two men as Fulcrum agents. While Casey follows the agents, Sarah and Cole violently undress and she manages to remove his belt. As Casey chases the agents, he lets a woman go after seeing she has a baby. However, she is also revealed to be a Fulcrum agent, and a shootout ensues. Meanwhile, Chuck races to and breaks into Cole's room to find a scantily-clad Sarah holding Cole at gunpoint, with his belt tied around her wrists.

Sarah gets dressed, and they drag Cole to the roof for transport. Cole warns them that they have made a mistake and he is actually an MI6 agent working undercover. Suddenly a helicopter appears and fires on the team. Cole protects Sarah and shoots a gas pipe that explodes and destroys the helicopter. He later explains that the only way to read the chip hidden in the belt buckle is to retrieve the playback device. Chuck pleads with the team to let him try to hack the chip, but they all say it's too risky, agreeing to let Cole go back under cover to contact Fulcrum. As Cole meets with Fulcrum agents at the hotel, Chuck attempts to hack the chip at the Buy More, triggering a homing device. Fulcrum agent Alexis White (Katrina Law) learns that their meeting is a setup, and she takes Sarah and Cole hostage. Alexis tracks the chip back to the Buy More. Chuck hacks the Fulcrum chip and finds his Fulcrum download video with his nom de guerre. As Alexis is walking in the Buy More, Chuck panics and smashes the chip.

As Cole, Sarah, and Chuck hang from chains in an abandoned warehouse, Chuck reveals that the chip contains information about him. Sarah warns Chuck not to tell the Fulcrum agents about the Intersect, no matter what the torture. Suddenly, Alexis arrives and threatens to poison Sarah if Chuck does not tell her who has the Intersect. Cole interrupts and asks if she really believes Chuck could be the Intersect. Just as Chuck reveals that he is the Intersect, Casey arrives with a tactical squad and saves Sarah. Rather than be taken prisoner, Alexis injects herself with ricin and smiles at Casey as she dies, saying "Fulcrum wins."

Cole promises not to tell anyone about Chuck's true identity, and the CIA lets him go. However, a policeman later pulls up to the car Cole is riding in and shoots the driver. Sarah arrives at Ellie Bartowski's house to tell Chuck he must go under 24-hour protection, meaning they will have to move in together. Their cover relationship must continue, canceling Chuck's plan of living with Morgan.

Chuck and Sarah
As Chuck eats breakfast with Ellie and her fiancée Devon Woodcomb, Ellie worries about Chuck, who appears to be ignoring Sarah. Taking Ellie's advice, Chuck heads to the Orange Orange yogurt shop and ends his cover relationship with Sarah, ironically only moments before Sarah is ordered to seduce Cole. Chuck is forced to listen to said seduction, while Casey enjoys his discomfort.

Chuck later decides to prove his worth to Sarah by hacking the chip, which only results in them being tortured with Cole. Chuck continues his  attempts to impress Sarah by enduring as much torture as Cole, but he faints when threatened with a needle. Though Sarah regrets being "dumped" by Chuck, she rewards Cole with a passionate goodbye kiss. Unfortunately, Chuck watches the exchange from a security monitor. Hurt, he approaches Morgan Grimes and asks him to be his roommate so that he can move out of Ellie's house and they can move on with their lives. However, Sarah is forced to put Chuck under 24-hour protection, meaning he and Sarah will have to move in together and continue their cover relationship.

Morgan
Morgan is growing increasingly disturbed by his mother's new relationship with his boss Big Mike, who has begun to refer to him as "son." Morgan avoids his mother's house by staying with Ellie and Devon. However, they discover Morgan looking for a snack one night, completely naked, greatly disturbing Ellie.

Chuck later approaches Morgan and asks him to be his roommate so that he can move out of Ellie's house and they can move on with their lives. Morgan is overjoyed. However, Sarah is forced to put Chuck under 24-hour protection, meaning Chuck and Sarah will have to move in together and continue their cover relationship.

Buy More
Jeff Barnes and Lester Patel are assigned to hire a new Buy More employee, which they turn into the search for the "Buy More Babe." They manage to lie to and offend nearly every potential employee. Threatened with a lawsuit by a swimsuit model (Brooklyn Decker), Jeff and Lester blame the entire encounter on Chuck, causing Chuck to be slapped. Big Mike receives a number of calls from Human Resources and demands that Chuck come to his office.

Production
Although "Chuck Versus the Best Friend" was produced before "Chuck Versus the Suburbs", the former was preempted for a presidential speech, and the airing order was swapped in the United States so that the Valentine's Day-themed "Chuck Versus the Suburbs" could air on its intended date in the week of the holiday. As a result, "Chuck Versus the Beefcake" continues plot points introduced in "Chuck Versus the Suburbs", with the episode beginning shortly after Brad White's burial.

Flashes
Chuck flashes on Cole's belt buckle in the surveillance video of him.
Chuck flashes on the Fulcram agents in the hotel.
Chuck flashes on Alexis as she enters the Buy More.

Cultural references
 Chuck inquires if he will be home in time to watch Charlie Rose.
 Cole is portrayed as a homage to James Bond.
 Barker says, "Come with me if you want to live," a direct quote from every installment of the Terminator franchise.
 Jeff mimics Sharon Stone in Basic Instinct by uncrossing his legs.

Critical response
"Chuck Versus the Beefcake" received positive reviews from critics. Keith Phipps of The A.V. Club gave the episode a B, calling it "a pretty good, if slightly-less-than-top-quality episode of one of the most predictably entertaining hours on television," explaining, "Why less-than-top quality? I think the Chuck/Sarah relationship is starting to go around in circles, and not in a fun, merry-go-round kind of way... That said, there was nothing really wrong with the way this episode treated Chuck and Sarah, and really nothing wrong with the way Zachary Levi and Yvonne Strahovski played it, particularly the long sequence in which our hero is forced to listen to Sarah make out with the titular beefcake (Jonathan Cake)."

Eric Goldman of IGN gave the episode an 8 out of 10, writing, "Overall, this was a decent episode, which gets a bit of a nudge up in my rating thanks to a couple of notable moments – most especially the absolutely huge action sequence that came near the end, as Barker and Sarah took on a heavily armed Fulcrum helicopter. Barker, two guns a' blazin', blowing up a gasoline tank, and the helicopter with it, was very cool and one of the biggest and most impressive action set pieces we've seen on this show."

Viewer response was also positive, with an 8.5/10 user rating at TV.com. The episode drew 6.657 million viewers.

References

External links
 

Beefcake
2009 American television episodes